New-Map is a former French manufacturer of motor-bikes and, more recently, of very small cars and delivery vehicles.   The business of powered vehicle production was instigated by Paul Martin at the bicycle plant that had been founded by his father, Joseph Martin, at the end of the previous century.   The motor-bike and small vehicle business operated from Lyon between 1920 and 1956.

Motor-bikes
The motor-bikes were powered using motors brought in from specialist suppliers such as AMC, Blackburne, J.A.P., MAG and Ydral.

Cars
Between 1938 and 1945 about 1,000 very small cars were produced.   They were powered by 100 cc engines from Sachs.   The cars featured open-topped bodies with space for two.

In 1946 a larger though similar (and still very small) voiturette appeared, now powered by a 125 cc engine.   Contemporary documentation indicates that this was in most respects a rerun of the prewar model featuring, slightly incongruously, a frontal design apparently copied from a Matford.  In 1947 production transferred to a new location in Clermont-Ferrand  and the car was renamed as the Rolux.

Delivery tricycles
Small three-wheeler delivery vehicles were also produced under the Solyto name.   This model was also produced, under licence, in Spain by Delfín

External links

  Internetseite des GTÜ

References

 Walter Zeichner: Kleinwagen International. Motorbuch-Verlag. Stuttgart 1999. 
 Jacques Rousseau und Jean-Paul Caron: Guide de l'automobile française. Solar, Paris 1988,  

Defunct motor vehicle manufacturers of France
Car manufacturers of France
Manufacturing companies based in Lyon
Vehicle manufacturing companies established in 1920
1920 establishments in France
Vehicle manufacturing companies disestablished in 1956
1956 disestablishments in France